Water grabbing involves the distribution of water resources in a way that leaves one or more parties feeling the distribution is less equitable.

It also can have damaging environmental effects as watersheds are made unsustainable by overuse of limited water.

See also 

 Nestlé

Green grabbing
Land rights
Land grabbing
Water privatisation

References

External links 
 Franco, J and Kay, S.(2012) The Global Water Grab: A primer Transnational Institute, the Netherlands

Water and politics